H. Umar Billah bin Muhammad Yahya, born Johanes Hubertus Eijkenboom, or more popularly known as Johny Indo (November 6, 1948 – January 26, 2020), was an Indonesian actor.

Biography 
Johny Indo was born with the name Johanes Hubertus Eijkenboom to a Dutch father and an Indonesian mother. His father was Mathias Eijkenboom, a Dutch soldier who came to Indonesia during the first Dutch Military Aggression, July–August 1947.

Johny Indo was originally known as a gold shop robber in Jakarta and its surroundings in the 1970s era which was carried out during the day with his Pachinko group (City China Troops).  Johny Indo's most famous action was to rob a gold shop in Cikini, Central Jakarta, in 1979.

Johny Indo was arrested in Sukabumi after the Pachinko group was first arrested. Johny Indo was then sentenced to 14 years in prison and thrown into the Nusakambangan prison. However, after only three years of serving his sentence, he and a gang of 34 people tried to escape from Nusakambangan, but he was caught after surviving 12 days.

After being free, he had played in a number of films, one of which was the story of himself in the film Johny Indo in 1987. In his old age, he still travels around preaching Islam and has the alias Umar Billah.

He died on January 26, 2020, after experiencing shortness of breath.

Filmography 

  (1987)
  (1989)
  (1989)
  (1989)
  (1989)
  (1989)
  (1989)
  (1990)
  (1990)
  (1990)
  (1990)
  (1991)
  (1991)
  (1991)

References 

1948 births
2020 deaths
Indo people
Indonesian male actors
Indonesian criminals
People from Garut
Indonesian people of Dutch descent
Converts to Islam from Christianity
Indonesian Islamic religious leaders